The 1924 Stanley Cup Finals saw the National Hockey League (NHL) champion Montreal Canadiens defeat the Western Canada Hockey League (WCHL) champion Calgary Tigers two games to none in the best-of-three game series. It was Montreal's fourth appearance in the Finals and second championship.

This was the last Finals until the 1983 Stanley Cup Finals to be contested by a team from Alberta and the last Finals until 1986 to be contested by a team from Calgary.

Paths to the Finals
As in 1922, the PCHA champion met the WCHL champion in a playoff, with the winner to meet the NHL champion in the Final. That series was held in Vancouver, Calgary and Winnipeg. The NHL champion would have to play the loser to advance to the Finals. Montreal first played the Vancouver Maroons, defeating them 2–0 in a best-of-three to advance to the Finals.

Game summaries
The first game was played in Montreal's Mount Royal Arena on slushy natural ice caused by warmer than usual weather. The second game was moved to Ottawa, to take advantage of the artificial ice.

Rookie forward Howie Morenz scored a hat trick in game one and a further goal in game two to lead the Canadiens. Morenz also was leveled by Calgary defenceman Herb Gardiner in game two and suffered torn shoulder ligaments and a chipped collarbone.

Stanley Cup engraving
The 1924 Stanley Cup was presented by the trophy's trustee William Foran to the Canadiens at a banquet at the Windsor Hotel in Montreal on April 1, 1924.

The following Canadiens players and staff had their names engraved on the Stanley Cup

1923–24 Montreal Canadiens

See also
1923–24 NHL season
1923–24 WCHL season
1923–24 Montreal Canadiens season

References
Bibliography

 

Notes

Stanley Cup
Montreal Canadiens games
Western Canada Hockey League postseason
Stanley
Stanley Cup Finals
March 1924 sports events
Ice hockey competitions in Ottawa
Ice hockey competitions in Montreal
1924 in Ontario
1924 in Quebec
1920s in Ottawa
1920s in Montreal